"No Such Thing" is the debut single of American singer-songwriter John Mayer. It was released in February 2002 as the lead single from his first album, Room for Squares (2001). Like many of the songs from Mayer's early musical career, the song was co-written with Clay Cook. The song has been used in episode 15 of the first season of Alias, also in episode 20 ("Obscura") of the first season of Smallville. It was Mayer's breakthrough hit, peaking at number 13 on the Billboard Hot 100, and becoming his highest-charting song until "Say" reached number 12 in 2007.

Content
Mayer and Cook wrote the song in about a week during 1998 in Duluth, Georgia.

Sung from the path of a recent high school graduate, "No Such Thing"'s lyrical themes encourage the audience to forge their own path, and not to "stay inside the lines". It is particularly critical of efforts by educators and guidance counselors to encourage students to go to college and to plan for careers in the "real world"; instead expressing that there is "no such thing" as this environment, and that true fulfillment comes from doing what you love.

Lyrically, the song is extremely direct and autobiographical in nature. Unlike many of his classmates, Mayer did not attend college immediately after graduating, opting instead to work at a gas station and saving money to buy a guitar. He eventually attended Berklee College of Music for several months before dropping out to move to Atlanta, where he began working with Clay Cook and ultimately launched his music career.

Music video
Initially, Mayer requested permission to film the music video at Fairfield Warde High School in Fairfield, Connecticut, the high school of which he is an alumnus. However, due to the disparaging nature of the song's lyrics towards the school and its faculty, the administration denied Mayer's request.

The song's promotional video was debuted on Mayer's official website.  VH1 chose the video for its Inside Track promotion, a distinction which endorses emerging artists. The official music video was released on October 2, 2009, on YouTube. As of January 4, 2019, the video has generated more than 12 million views.

Directed by Sam Erickson, it is a performance piece of Mayer singing the song to an audience at the Georgia Theatre in Athens, GA.

Critical reception
Haley Jones, who was the assistant PD of KFOG San Francisco—an early station to play the song, said, "It sounds great on the radio." Billboard said of the song's vocals, lyrics and melody, "What's not to love?" Jason Thompson with PopMatters said of the song, "it doesn't move me in any way." Stylus magazine praised "No Such Thing," calling it "lively."

Commercial performance
In the US, "No Such Thing" peaked at number 13 on the Billboard Hot 100 and also made appearances on four other Billboard charts; its highest peak was on the Triple A chart, where the song reached number one. The song was Mayer's highest-charting single in the US until 2008, when "Say" bested the peak of "No Such Thing" by one spot, hitting number 12.

Outside the US, the song found the most success in Australasia. It first charted in New Zealand in June 2002, reaching a peak of number 14 on September 22 and staying in the chart for 23 weeks in total; it ended 2002 as the country's 42nd best-selling single. In Australia, the single debuted at number 45 on September 29 and reached its peak position of number 28 on October 13. It spent five more week in top 50 before dropping out. To date, the song is Mayer's second best-charting solo single in both countries, after "Your Body Is a Wonderland". The song failed to make a significant impact in Europe, only reaching number 97 in the Netherlands and peaking outside the United Kingdom top 40 at number 42 in August 2003.

Track listing
All songs were written by John Mayer unless otherwise noted.
 "No Such Thing" – 3:51
 "My Stupid Mouth" – 3:45
 "Lenny" (live at the X Lounge) (Stevie Ray Vaughan)
 "The Wind Cries Mary" (live at the X Lounge) (Jimi Hendrix)

Personnel
 John Mayer: vocals, guitars, omnichord, Korg Triton synthesizer
 David LaBruyere: bass
 Nir Zidkyahu: drums
 Brandon Bush: Hammond organ, Wurlitzer electric piano
 John Alagia: percussion, production
 Jack Joseph Puig: mixing

Charts

Weekly charts

Year-end charts

Certifications

Release history

References

External links
 "No Such Thing" music video on YouTube

1999 songs
2002 debut singles
Columbia Records singles
John Mayer songs
Songs about school
Songs written by John Mayer